The 1982 Coatbridge and Airdrie by-election was a parliamentary by-election held on 24 June 1982 for the British House of Commons constituency of Coatbridge and Airdrie.

Previous MP 
The seat fell vacant when the constituency's Labour Member of Parliament (MP), James Dempsey (6 February 1917 – 12 May 1982) died.

He was a clerk with a haulage firm and a councillor on Lanarkshire County Council from 1945. He later worked as a lecturer on political economy and a writer on local government.

Dempsey was Member of Parliament for Coatbridge and Airdrie from 1959.

Candidates 
Four candidates were nominated. The list below is set out in descending order of the number of votes received at the by-election.

1. Representing the Labour Party was Tom Clarke, born in Coatbridge on 10 January 1941.

He had been assistant director of the Scottish Council for Education Technology. He had become a deputy director of the Scottish Film Council, where he had written the synopses for the film library catalogue. He had also been president of the British Amateur Cinematographers Central Council (based in Epsom) and organised the Scottish International Amateur Film Festival. He became a councillor on the Coatbridge Town Council aged 23 in 1964 where he served until it was abolished in 1974, and then became a member for its replacement the Monklands District Council until he was elected to parliament in 1982.

As a result of a series of boundary changes Clarke was MP for Coatbridge and Airdrie 1982 - 1983, for Monklands West 1983 - 1997, for Coatbridge and Chryston 1997 - 2005 and for Coatbridge, Chryston and Bellshill from 2005 until 2015.

2. The Conservative nominee was H. de Burgh.

3. The Scottish National Party candidate was R. Wyllie. He also contested Carrick, Cumnock and Doon Valley in the 1983 general election.

4. The Liberal Party candidate, representing the SDP-Liberal Alliance, was A. Henderson.

Result 

 Death of James Dempsey

Aftermath 

Scottish political journalist William Clark, writing in the following day's edition of the Glasgow Herald, stated that the "major upset from the poll" was the fact that the SNP and Liberal candidates both lost their deposits. In the same article Clark called the result "a disastrous blow" for the SDP–Liberal Alliance, particular as it came soon after Roy Jenkins victory for the SDP in the Glasgow Hillhead by-election. He predicted that the result would "guarantee an uphill struggle" in Scotland for the Alliance for some time to come.

This was the SNP's second lost deposit in two by-elections, following a similar result in Hillhead earlier in the year. Clark considered it a poor result and predicted it could lead to divisions between the Party's right and left-wings. He cited in evidence the fact that senior vice-president of the party Jim Sillars had said the bill for the lost deposit should be sent to party rival, the former MP and serving MEP, Winnie Ewing.

See also
 Coatbridge and Airdrie constituency
 Lists of United Kingdom by-elections
 United Kingdom by-election records

References

 British Parliamentary Election Results 1974-1983, compiled and edited by F.W.S. Craig (Parliamentary Research Services 1984).
 Times Guide to the House of Commons, 1979 and 1983 editions

1982 elections in the United Kingdom
1982 in Scotland
1980s elections in Scotland
June 1982 events in the United Kingdom
Coatbridge
1982 Coatbridge
Airdrie, North Lanarkshire
By-elections to the Parliament of the United Kingdom in Scottish constituencies